Dwayaangam is a genus of fungi in the family Orbiliaceae consisting of 8 species.

Species
Dwayaangam colodena Sokolski & Bérubé 2006
Dwayaangam cornuta Descals 1982
Dwayaangam dichotoma Nawawi 1985
Dwayaangam gamundiae Cazau, Aramb. & Cabello 1993
Dwayaangam heterospora G.L. Barron 1991
Dwayaangam junci Kohlm., Baral & Volkm.-Kohlm. 1998
Dwayaangam quadridens (Drechsler) Subram. 1978
Dwayaangam yakuensis (Matsush.) Matsush. 1981

References

External links

Leotiomycetes genera